Forbes is an American business magazine.

Forbes may also refer to:

People
 Forbes (name)
 Forbes family, a wealthy extended American family originating in Boston, descended from the Scottish clan
 Clan Forbes, a Scottish clan
 Lord Forbes, the senior Lord of Parliament in the Peerage of Scotland
 Kate Forbes, Scottish politician

Places
 Forbes, North Dakota, a small town in southern Dickey County
 Mount Forbes, a mountain in the Canadian Rockies
 Forbes Avenue (named after General John Forbes), one of the longest streets in Pittsburgh, Pennsylvania
 Forbes Field, the former home of the Pittsburgh Pirates
 Forbes Mill, a former mill, now a museum, in Los Gatos, California
 Forbes, New South Wales, a town and Local Government Area
 Forbes Park (disambiguation)
 Forbes Park, Makati, Philippines
 Forbes Park, Chelsea, Massachusetts, United States
Forbes, Ottawa, a neighbourhood in Ottawa, Canada
 Forbes, the German name for Borovany, Czech Republic
 Forbes River, a tributary of the Caniapiscau River, Nunavik, Nord-du-Québec, Quebec, Canada

Other uses
 Forbes (1805 ship)
 Forbes (band), a Swedish music band
 Forbes (engineering company)

See also
Forb, a type of flowering plant
John Forbes and Company, a 19th-century British trading firm
Fraternal Order of Real Bearded Santas (FORBS), an organization for men who look like Santa Claus